"Lobortas" Classic Jewelry House (before 2006 – Lobortas Jewelry House) is a Ukrainian jewellery company, founded on January 15, 1991 in Kyiv, the capital of Ukraine, by Igor Lobortas. The company makes handcrafted jewelry, including jewels with hard-fired enamels made with the use of an ancient technique brought to the medieval state of Kyivan Rus from Byzantium.

On July 21, 2011 the company set a Guinness World Record by inserting 2,525 cut diamonds in one ring, known as “Tsarevna Swan”.

On the asset side of the House there is a participation in the leading European exhibition Joalliers Createurs, Paris, France; personal exhibition opening in the Metropolitan Museum of Art, New York; an exhibition within the framework of the Church Council meeting, Jerusalem, Israel; exhibition within the framework of official reception of the Swedish king Carl XVI Gustaf; personal exhibition at Montenapoleone street, Milan, Italy; an exhibition in the State Hermitage Museum, Saint Petersburg, Russia; an exhibition within the framework of the grand embassy reception in the Kingdom of Denmark; presentation of the Marches on Bosporan chess set, on which Kim Won-soo, Under-Secretary-General of the United Nations, world champion Susan Polgar made a symbolic first moves on the Chess for Dialogue Tournament, held between children and UN permanent representatives, New York, USA. Works of the house were manufactured to the special order for Pope Francis I, Donald Trump, Michael of Kent, Pope Benedict XVI, Dalai Lama XIV, presidents of different countries and spiritual leaders of the world.

Awards

 Imperial Order of St. Anne's III degree
 «Honoured Worker of Culture of Ukraine»
 Order dedicated to 1020 jubilee of Kievan Russia baptism

References

Guinness World Records. Most diamonds set in one ring

Forbes. Ring Sets World Record With More Than 2,500 Diamonds

External links
Official website
 

Ukrainian companies established in 1991
Design companies established in 1991
Jewellery companies of Ukraine
Manufacturing companies based in Kyiv
Ukrainian brands